Dudhnai Assembly constituency is one of the 126 assembly constituencies of Assam Legislative Assembly. Dudhnai forms part of the Gauhati Lok Sabha constituency.

Members of Legislative Assembly 
 1962: Hakim Chandra Rabha, Indian National Congress
 1967: Sarat Chandra Rabha, Communist Party of India
 1972: Anandi Bala Rabha, Indian National Congress
 1978: Jagat Chandra Patgiri, Janata Party
 1983: Jagat Chandra Patgiri, Indian National Congress
 1985: Akan Chandra Rabha, Independent
 1991: Jagat Chandra Patgiri, Indian National Congress
 1996: Akan Chandra Rabha, Asom Gana Parishad
 2001: Pranoy Rabha, Indian National Congress
 2006: Deben Daimary, Indian National Congress
 2011: Sibcharan Basumatary, Indian National Congress
 2016: Dipak Rabha, Bharatiya Janata Party
 2021: Jadab Sawargiary, Indian National Congress

Election results

2016 results

See also
List of constituencies of the Assam Legislative Assembly

References

External links 
 

Assembly constituencies of Assam